(born 8 September 1981) is a Chinese sprint canoer who competed in the mid-2000s. At the 2004 Summer Olympics in Athens, he was eliminated in the semifinals of the C-1 1000 m event. He was born in Jinan, Shandong.

References

1981 births
Living people
Sportspeople from Jinan
Canoeists from Shandong
Olympic canoeists of China
Canoeists at the 2004 Summer Olympics
Chinese male canoeists